Pope Anastasius IV (r. 1153–54) created three cardinals in one consistory held during his pontificate.

December 1153
 Gregorio della Suburra
 Alberto
 Jacopo

Notes and references

Sources

College of Cardinals
Anastasius IV
12th-century cardinals
12th-century Catholicism